Arthur Atkinson may refer to:
 Arthur Atkinson (character), fictional character on the TV show The Fast Show
 Arthur Atkinson (footballer) (1909–1983), British football player for Hull City, Lincoln City, Mansfield Town
 Arthur Atkinson (politician, born 1833) (1833–1902), New Zealand politician representing Omata
 Arthur Atkinson (politician, born 1863) (1863–1935), New Zealand politician representing City of Wellington
 Arthur Atkinson (rugby league) (1906–1963), English rugby league footballer of the 1920s, 1930s and 1940s for Great Britain, England, Yorkshire, and Castleford
 Arthur Atkinson (speedway rider) (1911–?), English motorcycle speedway rider for the West Ham Hammers
 Arthur K. Atkinson (1892–1964), American railway president